

Seven ships of the Royal Navy have been named Warspite. The origins of the name are unclear, although it is probably from the Elizabethan-era spelling of the word 'spite' – 'spight' – in part embodying contempt for the Navy's enemies, but which was also the common name for the green woodpecker, suggesting the 'Warspight' would poke holes in enemy ships' (wooden) hulls. Until 1919 a woodpecker was used as the ships' crest; the official badge was a cannon, although the woodpecker continued to be used on the ships' tompions or gun muzzle plugs. Warspite carries the most battle honours of any ship in the Royal Navy, with the sixth Warspite being awarded fifteen of them.

  was a 29-gun galleon, originally known as Warspight. She was launched in 1596 and sold in 1649.
  was a 70-gun third-rate ship of the line launched in 1666. She was renamed  in 1721, rebuilt three times and broken up in 1771.
  was a 74-gun third rate launched in 1758. She was on harbour service from 1778, was renamed  in 1800 and was broken up in 1801.
  was a 76-gun third rate launched in 1807, razeed in 1840 and paid off in 1846. Lent to The Marine Society in 1862, she became a training ship until destroyed by fire in 1876.
  was an  first-class armoured cruiser launched in 1884 and scrapped in 1905.
  was a  launched in 1913. She served in the First World War and in numerous operations in the Second World War, earning the most battle honours of any Royal Navy ship. She ran aground on her way to be broken up in 1947 and was scrapped in 1950.
  was a  nuclear-powered submarine launched in 1965 and decommissioned in 1991.  She is currently awaiting disposal.
 HMS Warspite is the third planned  ballistic missile submarine.

Battle honours

 Cadiz 1596
 Orfordness 1666
 Sole Bay 1672
 Schooneveld 1673
 Texel 1673
 Barfleur 1692
 Velez Malaga 1705
 Marbella 1705
 Lagos 1759
 Quiberon 1759
 Jutland 1916
 Atlantic 1939
 Narvik 1940
 Norway 1940
 Calabria 1940
 Mediterranean 1940–43
 Malta Convoys 1941
 Matapan 1941
 Crete 1941
 Sicily 1943
 Salerno 1943
 English Channel 1944
 Normandy 1944
 Biscay 1944
 Walcheren 1944

See also
 Warspite, Alberta, a hamlet in Alberta, Canada

Citations

General and cited references
 
 
 

Royal Navy ship names